Anna B. Romanowska is a Polish mathematician specializing in abstract algebra. She is professor emeritus of algebra and combinatorics at the Warsaw University of Technology, and was the first convenor of European Women in Mathematics.

Education and career
Romanowska earned her Ph.D. in 1973 at the Warsaw University of Technology. She became the first convenor of European Women in Mathematics, for 1993–1994.

Books
Romanowska is the coauthor of three books on abstract algebra with Jonathan D. H. Smith:
Modal theory: an algebraic approach to order, geometry, and convexity (Heldermann, 1985)
Post-modern algebra (Wiley, 1999)
Modes (World Scientific, 2002)

References

External links

Year of birth missing (living people)
Living people
Polish mathematicians
Polish women mathematicians
Algebraists
Warsaw University of Technology alumni
Academic staff of the Warsaw University of Technology